Penicillium hetheringtonii is a species of the genus of Penicillium which is named after A.C. Hetherington. This species was first isolated from beach soil in Land's End Garden in Treasure Island, Florida in the United States. Penicillium hetheringtonii produces citrinin and quinolactacin.

References

Further reading

 
 

hetheringtonii
Fungi described in 2010